Ahir Bhairav is a Hindustani classical raga. It is a mixture of Bhairav and the ancient, rare raga Ahiri or Abhiri, or perhaps a mixture of Bhairav and Kafi.

Important traditional Compositions

Some of the most important traditional compositions in Raag Ahir Bhairav are:

 Man Rangeele (Teental 32BPM Vilambit)
 Shankara Mhaarare (180BPM Drut); popularised by Nagaraja Rao Havaldar
 Mohe Chedo Na Giridhaari (170 BPM Drut); popularised by Parveen Sultana

Theory

Arohana and avarohana 

Arohana: 

Avarohana: 

Key:

S, G, M, P, D: shuddha (natural);

r, n : komal (flat);

Pa and Sa are sometimes avoided in ascending Arohan. The descent can be direct, but is often expressed as S' N d P m, G m Gr ~ S with a slight oscillation on komal re to express the character of Bhairav.

Vadi and samavadi 

Vadi: 

Samavadi:

Pakad or Chalan 
S, r G M, G M r, ṇ Ḍ, ṇ r S

| komal Ni, shuddha Dha, komal Ni, komal Re, Sa | is the most characteristic run, where the Ni and Dha belong to the lower octave and the Re and Sa are from the middle octave. Some andolan/oscillation is typically at the flattened second (komal re).

Organization and relationships 
It may include impressions of Kafi. The image of Ahir Bhairav is easily maintained with the characteristic passage ṇ Ḍ ṇ/r~ S with the characteristic Bhairav andolan (oscillation) on komal re.  Sometimes shuddha ni is used in the lower octave to emphasize the Bhairav character.

The Carnatic music equivalent to this raga is Chakravakam.

Related ragas:
 Bhairav
 Nat Bhairav

Thaat: Bhairav

Behaviour 

Ahir Bhairav is a typical uttarang raga, which means emphasis is on the upper tetrachord.

Performance 

It is usually sung as the first Prahr of the morning, around 6:00 am – 9:00 am.

Important recordings 

Ravi Shankar, Three Classical Ragas. HMV LP, 1957. and Angel Records CD, 2000.

Hariprasad Chaurasia, Raga Ahir Bhairav and Marriage Song from Uttar Pradesh.  Nimbus Records CD, 1987.

Nikhil Banerjee, Raga Ahir Bhairav. Multitone Records, UK Limited, 1995. LP. (Available on iTunes.)

Wasif-ud-din Dagar, Chalo sakhi braj raje. Alap and Composition in Dhamar. Music Today. A97015. Cassette.

Film songs 

 "Man Anand Anand Chayo" (film: Vijeta)
 "Meri Veena Tum Bin Roye"
 "Ullathil Nalla Ullam" from "Karnan"
 "Puuchho Naa Kaise Maine Rain Bitaaii" Shiv Dayal Batish and Manna Dey. Composer S.D. Burman
 "Waqt Karataa Jo Wafaa Aap Hamaare Hote"
 "Ram Teri Ganga Maili Ho Gayee (Title Track)" (film: Ram Teri Ganga Maili)
 "Ab Tere Bin Jee Le.nge Ham" (film: Aashiqui)
 "Solah Baras Kii Baalii Umr Ko Salaam"
 "Albelaa Sajan Aayo Re" (film: Hum Dil De Chuke Sanam)
 "Aur Ho" (film: Rockstar)

In Tamil

Carnatic music 
Chakravakam, the 16th Melakarta raga of Carnatic music, which is a sampurna scale (all seven notes in ascending and descending scale), closely resembles Ahir Bhairav. However, in the modern times Ahir Bhairav raga has been used in a few Carnatic music compositions and many South Indian film songs as well.

Notes

References

Sources 
(most) entries due to:

External links 
 SRA on Samay and Ragas
 SRA on Ragas and Thaats
 Film Songs in Ahir Bhairav
 More details about raag AhirBhairav

Bhairav